Philip Albert Myburgh Hands (14 April 1890 – 27 April 1951), was a South African cricketer who played in seven Tests from 1913 to 1924. His elder brother Reginald also played Test cricket for South Africa, whilst his younger brother Kenneth was also a cricketer, although he didn't play Test cricket.

Hands was born in Claremont, Cape Town, son of Sir Harry Hands KBE and Lady Aletta Hands (née Myburgh) OBE. He died in Parys, Orange Free State, in 1951.

Like his brothers, he was educated at Diocesan College, Rondebosch and up to Oxford as a Rhodes Scholar in 1908. Initially starting a law degree, he switched to accounting.

Serving in the Royal Garrison Artillery, he was awarded the DSO and the MC in the First World War and reached the rank of major.

He was a hard-hitting batsman whose highest Test score was 83 against England in 1913–14, scored out of 98 in 105 minutes. He toured England in 1924, but was not successful.

References

External links

1890 births
1951 deaths
Cricketers from Cape Town
South Africa Test cricketers
South African cricketers
Western Province cricketers
Recipients of the Military Cross
Companions of the Distinguished Service Order
South African Rhodes Scholars
British Army personnel of World War I
Royal Garrison Artillery officers